Rideau (French for "curtain") may refer to:

In or near Ottawa, Ontario, Canada

Geographical features 
Rideau Canal
Rideau Falls
Rideau River
Rideau Trail

Towns and places 
Rideau Ferry, Ontario
Rideau Lakes, Ontario
Rideau Street
Rideau Township, Ontario
Rideau View

Buildings and structures 
Rideau Centre
Rideau Hall
Rideau High School
Rideau Valley

Clubs and organizations 
Rideau Canoe Club
Rideau Club
Rideau Curling Club

People with the surname
 Brandon Rideau (born 1982), American football player
 Iris Rideau (born c. 1937), American French Creole winemaker
 Laquincy Rideau (born 1996), American basketball player
 Stéphane Rideau (born 1976), French actor
 Wilbert Rideau (born 1942), American convicted killer

Other uses
Rideau (company), a Canada-based company providing recognition programs and products
Rideau Arcott, a Canadian breed of domestic sheep
Rideau, Cruchon et Compotier, a painting c. 1893 by Paul Cézanne
Rideau Park (Edmonton), a neighbourhood in Alberta, Canada
 Rideau Park, a community in Roxboro, Calgary, Canada
 The Curtain (essay), by Milan Kundera, published 2005 as Le Rideau
 Curtains (1995 film), a 1995 Canadian short film, in English and French, also known as Rideau

See also
Curtain (disambiguation)